Hexa-peri-hexabenzocoronene (HBC) is a polycyclic aromatic hydrocarbon with the molecular formula C42H18. It consists of a central coronene molecule, with an additional benzene ring fused between each adjacent pair of rings around the periphery. It is sometimes simply called hexabenzocoronene, however, there are other chemicals that share this less-specific name, such as hexa-cata-hexabenzocoronene.

Hexa-peri-hexabenzocoronene has been imaged by atomic force microscopy (AFM) providing the first example of a molecule in which differences in bond order and bond lengths of the individual bonds can be distinguished by a measurement in direct space.

Supramolecular structures 
Various hexabenzocoronenes have been investigated in supramolecular electronics. They are known to self-assemble into a columnar phase. One derivative in particular forms carbon nanotubes with interesting electrical properties.  The columnar phase in this compound further organises itself into sheets, which ultimately roll up like a carpet to form multi-walled nanotubes with an outer diameter of 20 nanometers and a wall thickness of 3 nm. In this geometry, the stacks of coronene disks are aligned with the length of the tube. The nanotubes have sufficient length to fit between two platinum nanogap electrodes produced by scanning probe nanofabrication and are 180 nm apart. The nanotubes as such are insulating, but, after one-electron oxidation with nitrosonium tetrafluoroborate, they conduct electricity. The structure containing three C-H groups on one benzene ring, so-called TRIO,  was analyzed by infrared spectroscopy.

Synthesis 
Organic synthesis of a hexabenzocoronene starts with an Aldol condensation reaction of dibenzyl ketone with a benzil derivative to give a substituted cyclopentadienone. A Diels–Alder reaction with alkyne and subsequent expulsion of carbon monoxide gives a hexaphenylbenzene. The adjacent pairs of benzene rings undergo oxidative electrocyclic reactions and aromatization by oxidation by iron(III) chloride in nitromethane.

References

External links

Polycyclic aromatic hydrocarbons